The Bellanca Aircruiser and Airbus were high-wing, single-engine aircraft built by Bellanca Aircraft Corporation of New Castle, Delaware. The aircraft was built as a "workhorse" intended for use as a passenger or cargo aircraft. It was available with wheels, floats or skis. The aircraft was powered by either a Wright Cyclone or Pratt and Whitney Hornet engine. The Airbus and Aircruiser served as both commercial and military transports.

Design and development
The first Bellanca Airbus was built in 1930 as the P-100. An efficient design, it was capable of carrying 12 to 14 passengers depending on the cabin interior configuration, with later versions carrying up to 15. In 1931, test pilot George Haldeman flew the P-100 a distance of 4,400 miles in a time aloft of 35 hours. Although efficient, with a cost per mile figure of eight cents per mile calculated for that flight, the first Airbus did not sell due to its water-cooled engine.

Operational history
The next model, the P-200 Airbus, was powered by a larger, more reliable air-cooled engine. One version (P-200-A) came with floats and operated as a ferry service in New York City, flying between Wall Street and the East River. Other versions included a P-200 Deluxe model, with custom interiors and seating for nine. The P-300 was designed to carry 15 passengers. The final model, the "Aircruiser," was the most efficient aircraft of its day, and would rank high amongst all aircraft designs. With a Wright Cyclone air-cooled supercharged radial engine rated at 715 hp, the Aircruiser could carry a useful load greater than its empty weight. In the mid-1930s, the Aircruiser could carry 4,000 lb payloads at a speed of between 145 and 155 mph, a performance that multi-engine Fokkers and Ford Trimotors could not come close to matching.

In 1934, United States federal regulations prohibited single-engine transports on United States airlines, virtually eliminating future markets for the Aircruiser. Where the workhorse capabilities of the Aircruiser stood out was in Canada. Several of "The Flying Ws", as it was commonly dubbed in Canada, were used in northern mining operations, ferrying ore, supplies and the occasional passenger, into the 1970s.

Variants

Airbus
Bellanca PCommercial version of Bellanca K, powered by a  Pratt & Whitney R-1860 Hornet.
P-100 Airbus
14-passenger monoplane powered by a  Curtiss Conqueror engine, one built, later converted into a P-200.
P-200 Airbus
12-passenger monoplane, nine built and one converted from P-100.
P-300 Airbus
15-seater monoplane powered by a Wright R-1820 Cyclone engine. 
Y1C-27
United States Army Air Corps designation for four P-200 Airbuses powered by  Pratt & Whitney R-1860 Hornet B engine. All later converted to C-27C.
C-27A Airbus
Production version of the Y1C-27 powered by a  Pratt & Whitney R-1860 Hornet B engine, ten built. One converted to a C-27B the rest converted to C-27Cs.
C-27B Airbus
One C-27A re-engined with a  Wright R-1820-17 Cyclone engine.
C-27C Airbus
Four Y1C-27s and nine of the C-27A re-engined with a  Wright R-1820-25 Cyclone engine.

Aircruiser
Aircruiser 66-67
Improved structure modified from a P-200 with a  Wright SR-1820 Cyclone engine
Aircruiser 66-70
An Aircruiser with a  Wright SGR-1820 Cyclone engine, five built - exported to Canada.
Aircruiser 66-75
An Aircruiser with a  Wright Cyclone engine, three built.
Aircruiser 66-76 
A cargo-version of the Aircruiser with a  Wright Cyclone.
Aircruiser 66-80
An Aircruiser with an  Wright Cyclone engine.

Operators

Canadian Pacific Airlines (Aircruiser)
Central Northern Airways (Aircruiser)
Mackenzie Air Service (Aircruiser)

New York and Suburban Airlines (Airbus)
United States Army Air Corps (Airbus)

Surviving aircraft

The last flying Aircruiser, "CF-BTW," a 1938 model, after serving in Manitoba, is now on display at the Erickson Aircraft Collection in Madras, Oregon.

Another Bellanca Aircruiser, "CF-AWR" named the "Eldorado Radium Silver Express", built in 1935, is under restoration at the Western Canada Aviation Museum in Winnipeg, Manitoba.

Specifications (66-70 Aircruiser)

See also

References

Notes

Bibliography

 Green, William and Gerald Pollinger. The Aircraft of the World. London: Macdonald, 1955.
 Gurling, Christian, Curator. "Bellanca Aircruiser." Tillamook, Oregon: Tillamook Air Museum, 2012.
 Mondey, David. The Complete Illustrated Encyclopedia of the World's Aircraft. Secaucus, New Jersey: Chartwell Books Inc, 1978. .

External links

 Bellanca's Big Birds – Wings Over Canada

1930s United States airliners
Aircruiser
Single-engined tractor aircraft
Aircraft first flown in 1930